The Norton F1 is a road-going sports motorcycle that Norton based on its RCW588 racing motorcycle. The F1 was offered in only one livery: black with gold decals and grey and gold stripes, to reflect John Player's sponsorship of Norton's race team. It was distinctive for using a 588 cc liquid-cooled twin-rotor Wankel engine.  This unit was developed from the motor in the Norton Commander.

References

F1
Motorcycles powered by Wankel engines
Motorcycles introduced in 1990